Why Fight It? is the sixth and final studio album by Australian rock band Mondo Rock, released in December 1990. The album includes former Beach Boys drummer Ricky Fataar and American guitarist Waddy Wachtel. The album peaked at number 102 in April 1991.

Track listing

Personnel
Mondo Rock:
Ross Wilson – vocals, harmonica
Eric McCusker – guitar, keyboards, backing vocals

with:
Waddy Wachtel – guitar, percussion, backing vocals
Bernie Worrell – organ, clavinet, synthesizer
Colin "Polly" Newham – keyboards and programming (tracks 1, 2, 5) 
Ian Belton – bass
Ricky Fataar – drums, backing vocals
Kipp Lennon, Mark Lennon, Michael Lennon – backing vocals (tracks 1, 4, 5)
Mark Williams, Mary Azzopardi – backing vocals (tracks 2, 3, 9, 10)

Production team:
Producer – Waddy Wachtel
Engineers – Andrew Scott, Shep Lonsdale
Mixed by – Shep Lonsdale

Charts

References

Mondo Rock albums
1990 albums
Albums produced by Waddy Wachtel
Bertelsmann Music Group albums